FC Dinamo Tbilisi is a Georgian professional football club based in Tbilisi, Georgia, that competes in the Erovnuli Liga, the top flight of Georgian football.

Dinamo Tbilisi was one of the most prominent clubs in Soviet football and a major contender in the Soviet Top League almost immediately after it was established in 1936. The club was then part of one of the leading sport societies in the Soviet Union, the All-Union Dynamo sports society which had several other divisions besides football and was sponsored by the Soviet Ministry of Internal Affairs. Its main claim to European fame was winning the Cup Winners' Cup in 1981, beating FC Carl Zeiss Jena of East Germany 2–1 in the final in Düsseldorf. It remains the only club based in Georgia to have ever lifted a trophy in European competition. Throughout its history, FC Dinamo Tbilisi produced many famous Soviet players: Boris Paichadze, Avtandil Gogoberidze, Shota Iamanidze, Mikheil Meskhi, Slava Metreveli, Murtaz Khurtsilava, Manuchar Machaidze, David Kipiani, Vladimir Gutsaev, Aleksandre Chivadze, Vitaly Daraselia, Ramaz Shengelia, and Tengiz Sulakvelidze. After the break-up of the Soviet Union, it would later produce some of the finest Georgian players such as Temur Ketsbaia, Shota Arveladze, Giorgi Kinkladze, Kakha Kaladze, and Levan Kobiashvili.

Dinamo Tbilisi was one of a handful of teams in the Soviet Top League (along with Dynamo Kyiv and Dynamo Moscow) that were never relegated. Their most famous coach was Nodar Akhalkatsi, who led the team to the Soviet title in 1978, two Soviet Cups (1976 and 1979), and the UEFA Cup Winners' Cup in 1981. He was also one of three co-coaches of the Soviet Union national football team during the FIFA World Cup in 1982. FC Dinamo Tbilisi are also 16–time Georgian league champions and 13–time Georgian Cup holders (the current records).

History

The beginning: 1920s
The history of FC Dinamo Tbilisi began in autumn 1925 when the Dinamo sports society set out to form a football club, at a time when football was gradually becoming one of the most greatest and popular sports in the world.

In 1927, FC Dinamo Tbilisi established a Junior club, "Norchi Dinamoeli" (young Dinamo). The Juniors club provided the senior with many young skillful players, including the first goalkeeper who played for Dinamo in the USSR championship, the first captain Shota Savgulidze, defender Mikhail Minaev, forward Vladimer Berdzenishvili and other famous players.

In the early years, no official championship existed in Georgia, so the teams played friendly games against each other. The first match was played with Azerbaijan team Dinamo Baku on 26 January 1926, with the more experienced Azerbaijan squad winning 1–0. The Dinamo team starred: D. Tsomaia, A. Pochkhua, M. Blankman, I. Fedorov, N. Anikin, A. Gonel, A. Pivovarov, O. Goldobin, A. Galperin, S. Maslenikov, and V. Tsomaia.

Three days later, Dinamo played another Azerbaijani team, "Progress", and easily beat them 3–0.

Despite their success in the middle years of the 1930s, the Football Federation of the Soviet Union placed FC Dinamo Tbilisi in the first league instead of the Top League. Dinamo continued to show good form against the top teams, winning 9–5 in Tbilisi against probably the best team in the USSR championship, Dynamo Moscow. They later beat Dinamo Leningrad 3–2, winning 5 matches out of 6 plus a draw against Stalinec Moscow. This was enough for Dinamo to qualify for the top league.

World War II: 1930s and 1940s
The second championship started in autumn 1936. Altogether Dinamo played 1424 matches in the Soviet Union Championship. The first match was against Dynamo Kyiv, finishing 2–2, with goals by Nikolas Somov and Boris Paichadze. The team sheet was: A. Dorokhov, S. Shavgulidze (E. Nikolaishvili), B. Berdzenishvili, N. Anikin, V. Jorbenadze, G. Gagua, I. Panin, M. Berdzenishvili, B. Paichadze, M. Aslamazov, and N. Somov.

The first victory in the USSR championship was in the match against Spartak Moscow on 25 September with Mikheil Berdzenishvili scoring the winning goal. Dinamo finished the season in 3rd place. They challenged for the title, but this faded after the 2–3 loss against Krasnaia Zaria Leningrad. Dinamo also played an unforgettable match in Moscow against Spartak Moscow in the Soviet Cup quarter-final, when Dinamo beat them 6–3. They reached the first edition of the Soviet Cup final, but lost 0–2 to Lokomotiv Moscow. Their first international match was against the Spanish team Baskonia in 1937, which Dinamo lost 0–2.

In the 1930s and 1940s, Dinamo was one of the top Soviet football teams, even though they did not win a title. They were often referred to as the "crownless champions" with the team including S. Shavgulidze, A. Dorokhov, S. Shudra, B. Frolov, M. Berdzenishvili, A. Kiknadze, V. Paniukov, V. Berezhnoi, G. Gagua, V. Jorbenadze, and G. Jejelava.

1950s
In the 1950s, the team was led by Avtandil Gogoberidze who spent 17 years with Dinamo. He still holds the record for games played and goals scored for Dinamo, with 341 matches and 127 goals. In the same period, the following players starred for Dinamo: G. Antadze, Vladimer Marghania, N. Dziapshipa, M. Minaev, A. Zazroev, V. Eloshvili, and Avtandil Chkuaseli.

A prominent place in Dinamo history belongs to Andro Jordania, a coach who is considered as one most important figures in the club's history. His period in charge was seen as "the Renaissance" of Dinamo's traditions, which laid the ground for the major successes connected with his name. The club's Digomi practice ground is named after him.

First Soviet successes: 1960s
The first major success came in the 1964 Soviet Top League when Dinamo won the Soviet Top League, with the team unbeaten in the last 15 matches. At the end, Dinamo was tied with Torpedo Moscow so the teams played an additional match in Tashkent, Uzbekistan, which Dinamo won 4–1. Georgian supporters celebrated the victory by naming their team "Golden Guys".

A popular French magazine, France Football, wrote: "Dinamo has great players. Their technique, skills, and playing intellect enables us to name them the best Eastern representatives of 'South American Football Traditions'. If Dinamo were able to participate in the UEFA European Cup, we are certain, they would bring the hegemony of Spanish-Italian teams to an end." However, no Soviet team appeared in the European Cup at that time.

The line-up of the winning team in 1964 was: Sergo Kotrikadze, Giorgi Sichinava, Guram Petriashvili, Jemal Zeinklishvili, Guram Tskhovrebov, Vakhtang Rekhviashvili, Shota Iamanidze, Slava Metreveli, Vladimer Barkaia, Mikheil Meskhi, Ilia Datunashvili, and Alexander Apshev. Coach: Gavriil Kachalin.

In the late 1960s and early 1970s, the quality of the Dinamo team was further enhanced by several skillful players: Mikheil Meskhi, Slava Metreveli, Murtaz Khurtsilava, Revaz Dzodzuashvili, Kakhi Asatiani, Gocha Gavasheli, Guram Petriashvili, Piruz Kanteladze, and the Nodia brothers, Givi and Levan.

European years: 1970s
Dinamo's first appearance in Europe was in 1972 against Dutch team Twente in the UEFA Cup. Dinamo won the game 3–2, with two goals scored by Givi Nodia and one by David Kipiani. The following players appeared on the field in this historic match: David Gogia, Revaz Dzodzuashvili, Vakhtang Chelidze, Murtaz Khurtsilava, Shota Khinchagashvili, Guram Petriashvili, Manuchar Machaidze, Kakhi Asatiani, Vladimir Gutsaev, Levan Nodia, Givi Nodia, and David Kipiani. In the second match Twente won the game 2–0 and progressed to the next round.

In 1973 Dinamo won their first International tournament. After beating Atlético Madrid and Benfica, the club won the Columbus's Caravela Trophy.

In 1976 Nodar Akhalkatsi was appointed as Dinamo's head coach. It was under his leadership that Dinamo achieved greatest success. The club was referred to as the "Great Team" between 1976 and 1982, characterised by a mobile, fast and technical style of play.

In this period Dinamo won the Soviet Cup for the first time in their history, convincingly defeating Armenian side Ararat Yerevan 3–0 in the final, with goals scored by David Kipiani, Piruz Kanteladze and Revaz Chelebadze. In 1978 the club won the Soviet Top League for a second time. Next year Dinamo won the Soviet Cup again by defeating Russian side Dynamo Moscow in the final. In 1979 the club played its first match in the UEFA European Cup tournament. In the first round Dinamo knocked out English side Liverpool, at the time one of the strongest teams in European football. After losing the first match at Anfield 1–2, Dinamo comfortably beat the opponent 3–0 in Tbilisi and advanced to the next round, where they were eliminated by German champions Hamburg. In the 1970s Dinamo also eliminated famous Italian sides Inter Milan and Napoli in European competitions.

|

|

|

Last Soviet days: 1980s

The highlight of Dinamo's history was winning the 1980–81 European Cup Winners' Cup, including knocking out clubs like West Ham United (4–1, 0–1) and Feyenoord Rotterdam (3–0, 0–2), and beating East German side Carl Zeiss Jena 2–1 in the final on 13 May 1981. Vitaly Daraselia and Vladimir Gutsaev scored goals in the final.

Helmut Schön, 1974 FIFA World Cup winning coach said: "It is to be said directly, Dinamo deserved the victory. This team has top-quality performers."

Next year in 1982 as reigning champions Dinamo advanced to the semi-finals in the Cup Winners' Cup tournament, where they were eliminated by Belgian side Standard Liège. In the 1980s numerous skillful players appeared on the team, but for various reasons they were not able to do their best: Grigol Tsaava, Mikheil Meskhi (Junior), Otar Korghalidze, Gia Guruli, Mamuka Pantsulaia, Merab Jordania, Levan Baratashvili and many other talented players.

In 1983 a crisis began. It was hard for the club to go through the first rounds of the Soviet Cup. They also performed poorly in the championship. From 1983 to 1989 the team appeared only once in the UEFA tournaments.

Dinamo Tbilisi played its last game in the Soviet Top League on 27 October 1989 against Dynamo Kyiv. Dinamo played its first and last official matches in the Soviet championship with Dynamo Kyiv, with both matches ending 2–2.

1990s
In 1990 the Georgian Football Federation refused to participate in the Soviet Union championship. That meant that no Georgian football clubs would appear in Soviet tournaments. From that moment the more recent history of FC Dinamo Tbilisi began.

During this time, as a means of distancing from the Soviet past, the club was renamed Iberia Tbilisi. This move was largely opposed by the supporters and by 1992 the club reverted to its initial name.

The club played its first match in the Georgian National championship against Kolkheti Poti on 30 March 1990. Dinamo lost the historic match, 0–1. Ultimately the club recovered from this setback and won the first Georgian National championship. The club also won the next 9 championships.

In 1992 came Dinamo's first double: the team won the league and the Georgian Cup, beating Tskhumi Sokhumi in the final. In 1993 Dinamo played its first international official match representing independent Georgia. Dinamo won the home match against Linfield 2–1, with goals from Shota Arveladze and Gela Inalishvili. The second leg in Belfast ended 1–1. However the club was disqualified for attempting to bribe the referee in the first leg.

Despite continued success in national cups and championships, the club had no success in European club tournaments.

In 1996 Dinamo passed 3 rounds in the UEFA Cup. They beat CS Grevenmacher 4–0, 2–2, Molde FK 2–1, 0–0 and Torpedo Moscow 1–0, 1–1. In the next round the club was unable to overcome Portuguese side Boavista and left the tournament.

Dinamo came very close to advancing in the 1998–99 UEFA Champions League group stages, but were eliminated by Athletic Bilbao on the away goals rule, 2–1, 0–1. The migration of key players to European clubs caused negative results. It became harder and harder for the club to win the Georgian Championship or Georgian Cup.

2000s
In the early 2000s, famous Georgian businessman Badri Patarkatsishvili purchased FC Dinamo Tbilisi. In 2003 the club won the Georgian Championship and Georgian Cup.

In 2004 Dinamo, under the leadership of Croatian coach Ivo Šušak, won the CIS Cup in Moscow, beating Latvian side Skonto 3–1 in the final. In the same year, Dinamo successfully made it through the UEFA Cup qualifying rounds, after defeating BATE Borisov (1–0, 3–2), Slavia Prague (2–0, 1–3) and Wisła Kraków (2–1, 3–4) and qualified for the group stage, where their opponents were Newcastle United, Sporting CP, Sochaux and Panionios. Dinamo lost all four games and finished bottom in the group.

In the following season Dinamo were again Georgian champions and they won the Georgian championship again in 2008, when the head coach of Dinamo was Czech Dušan Uhrin.

In 2009 the club beat Olimpi Rustavi and won the Georgian Cup.

2010s
In January 2011, FC Dinamo Tbilisi was purchased by Georgian businessman Roman Pipia. That year, the club successfully played in the UEFA Europa League qualifying rounds, but they were not able to overcome AEK Athens in the play-off round.

After a bad performance in the Georgian championship of 2011–12, Dinamo could not qualify for any UEFA competitions for the first time.
The new owner immediately started the modernization of the club starting with the reconstruction of the Digomi training ground. The Boris Paichadze Dinamo Arena was reconstructed as well. The pitch surface was changed with a new specially adapted surface for the local climate. Renovated Youths Football Academy also began.

The club were beaten 5–0 by Tottenham Hotspur in the Europa League play-off round in the 1st leg and again 3–0 the following week at White Hart Lane, thus crashing out 8–0 on aggregate.

After that in national competitions Dinamo won the double in the 2013, 2014 and 2016 seasons.

Stadium
Construction of the Dinamo stadium started in autumn 1929 although the project was soon suspended. The construction was renewed in 1933 (chief architect – Archil Kurdiani). Finally it finished on 12 October 1935 and envisaged 23 000 spectators.

In 1960–1962 the stadium was reconstructed and the number of spectators increased to 36 000. After reconstruction the stadium was officially opened on 27 July 1962. Dinamo Tbilisi hosted FC Dynamo Leningrad in the Soviet championship and defeated it with minimal score 1–0.

The demand for a new and bigger stadium had increased due to the successful performance of Dinamo Tbilisi. This was the Communist time, when every problem had to be solved by the USSR supreme government body. The leader and the first secretary of Georgian Communist Party Eduard Shevardnadze was able to persuade official Moscow, that Georgia needed a bigger and better stadium for home matches. By the time the stadium was built, it had the third biggest capacity in the Soviet Union. It could fit 78,000 supporters and fulfill every standard and requirement of the Soviet Football Federation as well as the UEFA.

The first official match played after the stadium was built occurred on 29 September 1976. This was the UEFA Cup Winners' Cup 1/16 final match between Dinamo Tbilisi and Cardiff City. Dinamo won the opening game 3–0.

The next reconstruction of the stadium was held in 2006 (architects-Gia Kurdiani and Archil Kurdiani Junior) and the number of spectators was changed to 54,549. The stadium was opened with the European championship qualifying match. On 6 September 2006 the Georgia national team hosted the France national team and was defeated with the score 3–0. In 2012 the turf of Dinamo Arena was changed. Energy and irrigation systems were also fully rehabilitated. There was new lighting to satisfy demands for high standards. The VIP box was fully changed and fixed according to UEFA standards.

Even though the stadium's maximum capacity was 78,000, Georgian football fans can remember matches with more accommodation. For instance, in 1979 Dinamo was hosting one of the best British teams – Liverpool. The first match was played in England at Anfield, and Liverpool won 2–1. The attendance was 110,000 and their support played an important role in winning. Dinamo beat Liverpool 3–0 and qualified in the next round. In the Soviet Union Dinamo stadium kept the record with an average attendance of 45,000.

The record attendance was repeated in 1995 for Georgia vs Germany. The football clubs Spartak Moscow and Dynamo Kyiv often played their autumn international matches at this stadium.

Hundreds of Georgian, European and even South American stars played in Dinamo stadium. In 1985 the stadium hosted the qualifying stage of the Juniors World Cup. Cláudio Taffarel and Muller played for the Brazil national team.

In 1995 the stadium was renamed Boris Paichadze National Stadium after a major Georgian international footballer. It is home to the Georgia national football team.
Holding lit torches, 80,000 fans came in 1981 to congratulate the team on their European Cup Winners Cup triumph.

The stadium hosted the 2015 UEFA Super Cup match between Barcelona and Sevilla. Barcelona won 5–4 in extra time.

Football kits and sponsors

Players

Current squad

Honours
Dinamo Tbilisi is by far the most successful football club in Georgia, having won the championship 18 times and the cup 13 times. Dinamo also was one of the major football clubs in Soviet football that has never been relegated from the top league, and alongside Ukrainian Dynamo Kyiv was the only club in Soviet era to win European competition.

Domestic

Georgian
Erovnuli Liga
 Winners (19): 1990, 1991, 1991–92, 1992–93, 1993–94, 1994–95, 1995–96, 1996–97, 1997–98, 1998–99, 2002–03, 2004–05, 2007–08, 2012–13, 2013–14, 2015–16, 2019, 2020, 2022 (record)
Georgian Cup
 Winners (13): 1991–92, 1992–93, 1993–94, 1994–95, 1995–96, 1996–97, 2002–03, 2003–04, 2008–09, 2012–13, 2013–14, 2014–15, 2015–16 (record)
Georgian Super Cup
 Winners (8):  1996, 1997, 1999, 2005, 2008, 2014, 2015, 2021 (record)

Soviet
Soviet Top League
 Winners (2):   1964, 1978
Soviet Cup
 Winners (2): 1976, 1979

European
UEFA Cup Winners' Cup
 Winners (1): 1980–81

Other international competitions
Commonwealth of Independent States Cup (level 1)
 Winners: (1) 2004

Individual player awards
Soviet Footballer of the Year
 David Kipiani – 1977
 Ramaz Shengelia – 1978
 Aleksandre Chivadze – 1980
 Ramaz Shengelia – 1981

Georgian Footballer of the Year
 Temur Ketsbaia – 1990
 Giorgi Kinkladze – 1993

European Championship winners

Three players have won the 1960 European Championship whilst at Dinamo Tbilisi:

 Givi Chokheli
 Zaur Kaloev
 Mikheil Meskhi

Olympic gold medalists

One player has won the Seoul 1988 Olympic gold medal whilst in Dinamo Tbilisi:

 Gela Ketashvili

Managerial history
All managers of FC Dinamo Tbilisi:

European campaigns
Updated 7 July 2022

European record

UEFA club rankings

Seasons

Key

 P = Played
 W = Games won
 D = Games drawn
 L = Games lost
 F = Goals for
 A = Goals against
 Pts = Points
 Pos = Final position

 ERL = Erovnuli Liga
 STL = Soviet Top League
 SFL = Soviet First League

R1 = First round
R2 = Second round
R3 = Third round
QF = Quarter-finals
SF = Semi-finals
GS = Group stage
QR1 = First Qualifying Round
QR2 = Second Qualifying Round
QR3 = Third Qualifying Round

Soviet Union

Georgia

References

External links

 
 Dinamo Tbilisi on Soccerway
 Dinamo Tbilisi results
 Dinamo Tbilisi head-to-head results in Soviet years at wildstat.com
 Dinamo Tbilisi head-to-head results since independence at wildstat.com

 
Dinamo Tbilisi
Association football clubs established in 1925
Dinamo Tbilisi
Soviet Top League clubs
Dinamo Tbilisi
Dinamo